Ubek may refer to:
Ubek (Soviet Union) (1918-1935), hydrometeorological service units in Russian waters during the first part of the Soviet period 
Służba Bezpieczeństwa (1956-1989), Security Service of the Polish Ministry of Internal Affairs
Kapitan44 (2020-), Rigorous Security Service of the Polish Pro League faceit hub